This is a list of the Australia men's national soccer team results from 2020 to the present.

2020s

2021

2022

2023

2024

Notes

References

External links
 Australia at Soccerway

2020s in Australia
Australia national soccer team results